Teije ten Den  (born 29 April 1993) is a Dutch footballer who plays as a forward for Tweede Divisie club De Treffers.

Career
Ten Den started his career as a football player at the age of five with the amateurs of Rohda Raalte, and was promoted to the first team in 2011. In July 2012, he was signed by professional club Go Ahead Eagles. Ten Den made his debut on 29 August 2014 in the 1–0 home win against Willem II, where he was brought in for Marnix Kolder in the final phase of the game. On 20 September 2014, he scored his first goal in professional football. In the 60th minute, he headed the ball via Timothy Derijck and past goalkeeper Martin Hansen against ADO Den Haag. Ten Den made his first start on 24 September 2014, in the 2–0 cup win over Feyenoord. In February 2015, he was sent on loan to FC Oss for six months. In 2016, Ten Den was sent on another loan – this time to Helmond Sport – for one year.

On 18 June 2017, Ten Den signed a two-year contract with Volendam. His contract was terminated by mutual consent on 31 January 2019. He continued his career in Spain with Guijuelo competing in the Segunda División B. In August 2019, he moved to Hospitalet in the fourth-tier Tercera División. In the 2020–21 season he played at semi-professional level for Kozakken Boys in the Dutch Tweede Divisie. In March 2021, Ten Den reached an agreement with De Treffers, which would see him join the club from the start of the 2021–22 season. He made his debut for the club on 22 August 2021 in a 1–1 draw against Jong Sparta Rotterdam in the Tweede Divisie.

References

External links
 
 

1993 births
Living people
Dutch footballers
Dutch expatriate footballers
Association football forwards
Rohda Raalte players
Go Ahead Eagles players
TOP Oss players
Helmond Sport players
FC Volendam players
CD Guijuelo footballers
CE L'Hospitalet players
Kozakken Boys players
De Treffers players
Eredivisie players
Eerste Divisie players
Tweede Divisie players
Segunda División B players
Tercera División players
Footballers from Utrecht (city)
Dutch expatriate sportspeople in Spain
Expatriate footballers in Spain